Hoplunnis schmidti is an eel in the family Nettastomatidae (duckbill/witch eels). It was described by Johann Jakob Kaup in 1860. It is a marine, tropical eel which is known from Venezuela, in the western central Atlantic Ocean.

Due to a lack of known major threats to H. schmidti, the IUCN redlist currently lists it as Least Concern.

References

Nettastomatidae
Fish described in 1860